Jan Johansson (born 12 September 1943) is a Swedish bobsledder. He competed at the 1972 Winter Olympics and the 1976 Winter Olympics.

References

External links
 

1943 births
Living people
Swedish male bobsledders
Olympic bobsledders of Sweden
Bobsledders at the 1972 Winter Olympics
Bobsledders at the 1976 Winter Olympics
People from Kalix Municipality
Sportspeople from Norrbotten County
20th-century Swedish people